Giacomo Lomellino del Canto (died 9 August 1575) was a Roman Catholic prelate who served as Archbishop of Palermo (1571–1575), Bishop of Mazara del Vallo (1562–1571),
and Bishop of Guardialfiera (1557–1562).

Biography
On 21 June 1557, Giacomo Lomellino del Canto was appointed by Pope Paul IV as Bishop of Guardialfiera. On 17 April 1562, he was appointed by Pope Pius IV as Bishop of Mazara del Vallo. On 10 Jan 1571, he was appointed by Pope Pius V as Archbishop of Palermo. He served as Archbishop of Palermo until his death on 9 August 1575.

While bishop, he was the principal co-consecrator of Ludovico de Torres (archbishop), Archbishop of Monreale (1573) and Marco Saracini, Bishop of Volterra (1574).

References

External links and additional sources
 (for Chronology of Bishops) 
 (for Chronology of Bishops) 
 (for Chronology of Bishops) 
 (for Chronology of Bishops) 

16th-century Roman Catholic archbishops in Sicily
1575 deaths
Bishops appointed by Pope Paul IV
Bishops appointed by Pope Pius IV
Bishops appointed by Pope Pius V